Carlos Rodríguez-Pastor Mendoza (1934 - 5 August 1995) was a Peruvian businessman and politician.

He was Peru's Minister of Economy and Finance from 1983 to 1984. In 1994, he bought Banco Internacional del Peru, but died the following year.

He is the father of the billionaire businessman Carlos Rodriguez-Pastor, and uncle of journalist Carlos Lozada.

References

1995 deaths
20th-century Peruvian businesspeople
Peruvian Ministers of Economy and Finance
Peruvian bankers
1934 births